Straubinger Tagblatt is a German language newspaper published in Straubing, Germany.It was founded in 1860 and its first editor was Cl. Attenkofer.

References

External Links
Straubinger Tagblatt official Website

1860 establishments in Germany
Newspapers published in Germany
German-language newspapers
Newspapers established in 1860